Strohm is a surname. Notable people with the surname include:

 Adam Strohm (1870–1951), American librarian
 Chuck Strohm (born 1964), American politician
 Gertrude Strohm (1843-1927), American author, compiler and game designer
 Harry Strohm (1901–1975), American minor league baseball player and manager
 Heinrich Karl Strohm (1895–1959), German opera manager
 John Strohm (congressman) (1793–1884), American politician
 John Strohm (musician) (born 1967), American guitarist, singer and lawyer
 Reinhard Strohm (born 1942), German musicologist
 Thomas Strohm (1846–1929), American fire chief of Los Angeles and City Council member

See also
Peter Strohm, a German television series